Tomocerus longicornis is a common species of Collembola. It is identified by the empodium's filament reaching beyond the claw of the foot. It is grey-brown with blue pigment on the femur.  It is approximately 9mm long with long antennae that curl in an unusual spiral shape when touched.

References 

Collembola
Animals described in 1776